Paul Lyons (31 March 1969 – 8 September 2019) was an Australian taekwondo practitioner. He competed at the 1992 Barcelona Summer Olympics, where taekwondo was a demonstration sport and the 2000 Summer Olympics in Sydney. He was later appointed National Junior Development Coach for taekwondo and was the head coach of a martial arts school in Melbourne. In 2018, he competed on the second season of Australian Ninja Warrior.

References

External links

1969 births
2019 deaths
Australian male taekwondo practitioners
Australian Ninja Warrior contestants
Olympic taekwondo practitioners of Australia
Taekwondo practitioners at the 1992 Summer Olympics
Taekwondo practitioners at the 2000 Summer Olympics
20th-century Australian people